Benetice is a village and administrative part of Světlá nad Sázavou in the Vysočina Region of the Czech Republic. As of 2021, it had 18 inhabitants.

History
There was a glass factory in Benetice. It does not exist anymore, but some local names of places are derived from the parts of the glass factory as name Na sušírnách or Sklárenský Pond.

A linden-tree grows on village green of Benetice. It was planted in 1945.

Economy
There is recreation camp in Benetice. It was used as Pionýr camp and it was used for young people from Hungary, Poland and Germany.

Gallery

External links

Unofficial website
Czech page about Benetice

Villages in Havlíčkův Brod District
Neighbourhoods in the Czech Republic